Dr Gary Hartstein, M.D. (born 17 May 1955 in Staten Island, United States), is Clinical Professor of Anesthesia and Emergency Medicine at University of Liège Hospital, Liège, Belgium and former FIA Medical Delegate for the Formula One World Championship.

After finishing his undergraduate study at the University of Rochester, Hartstein trained as a physician in Belgium during the 1970s. In 1983 he returned to his native New York, spending six years at the Albert Einstein College of Medicine, in the Bronx, specialising in anaesthesiology.

In 1989 Hartstein returned to Belgium and began working at Circuit de Spa-Francorchamps as part of the local medical team attending races. In 1990 Hartstein was assigned to the medical car containing Professor Sid Watkins and the two physicians immediately formed a firm friendship.

Hartstein's work at the Belgian Grand Prix continued until 1997 when the FIA, realising the need for an anaesthetist to assist Watkins, recruited him. For the next seven years Hartstein and Watkins rode together in the medical car at the start of most races.

In January 2005 Sid Watkins announced that he was to retire as Formula One Medical Delegate and Hartstein was selected as his successor.

Since that time, Hartstein has been key in developing some of the FIA's new approaches and policies in terms of medical safety. Hartstein was the chair of the FIA Institute's Medical Training Working Group, which aims to standardize training and practices of motorsport doctors, based on the most up-to-date trauma training techniques.
He was also, with Prof Gerard Saillant, behind the creation of the "FIA Institute Faculty" (FIMF), which will seek to consolidate the expertise of motor sport doctors and medical staff around the world, on the model of professional associations.

In December 2012 Hartstein did not have his contract renewed as Formula One Medical Delegate. His successor was Chief Medical Officer of the British Grand Prix, Doctor Ian Roberts.

In April 2015 Hartstein moved to Abu Dhabi to work as a consultant anesthesiologist.

References

External links
 Official Twitter
 Personal Blog: A Former F1 Doc Writes

1955 births
Living people
People from Staten Island
University of Rochester alumni
Albert Einstein College of Medicine alumni
Belgian anaesthesiologists
Academic staff of the University of Liège
Formula One people
American motorsport people
American expatriates in Belgium
Belgian sports physicians